Neuchatel is an unincorporated community in Nemaha County, Kansas, United States.

History
Neuchatel was founded in 1870 by French and Swiss immigrants.

References

Further reading

External links
 Nemaha County maps: Current, Historic, KDOT

Unincorporated communities in Nemaha County, Kansas
Unincorporated communities in Kansas
French-American history
Swiss-American history
1870 establishments in Kansas
Populated places established in 1870